Klek is mountain in north-western Croatia, near Ogulin in Karlovac County. It is the easternmost mountain of the Velika Kapela range of the Dinaric Alps.

The mountain is one of the best-known Croatian botanist reserves and home to a number of protected species of mountain flora.

According to the 17th century tale, during the nights of storm, the summit of Klek is a midnight gathering point for witches and fairies.

In the early 20th century, Klek's east and south face nurtured numerous Croatian rock climbers. The longest route length exceeds 200 m, with difficulty up to 5.12a.

Geography and geology 
Klek is positioned as a prominent ridge on the eastern tips of Velika Kapela, and its slopes descend toward Ogulin and the valley of Dobra. The peaks are steep and rocky, and there are two most important ones, Klečice or Mali Klek (1058 m), and Veliki Klek (or just Klek, 1182 m), with its prominent vertical 200 meters high "southern rock".

Klek rose during the Alpine orogeny in Tertiary, and geologically it consists of carbon sediments, i.e. Jurassic limestone and dolomite, while the peak part is made of Cretaceous limestones.

There are several speleological objects on the massif: the Horvat's or Klek cave (Klečka spilja in Croatian), the Half-cave (Polupećina in Croatian), the Jarunčica na Zakopi pit cave, and two pits found in this century, the Witch's pit cave (133 m deep), and another one whose entry is near the peak, at the height of 1162 m.

The climate is mountain with heavy rainfall, which encourages the formation of seeping and torrent streams that gather in Klek's ravine (Klečka draga in Croatian) or Peras' gulch (Perasov jarak in Croatian). Behind Peras' gulch on the northern slope of Klek there is also a ruin of the old Frankopan castle Vitunj, above a village named the same.

See also
 List of mountains in Croatia

References

External links
 description at Summitpost.org
 Klek climbing routes at Rockclimbing.com

Landforms of Karlovac County
Mountains of Croatia
Ogulin